The African sheath-tailed bat (Coleura afra) is a species of sac-winged bat in the family Emballonuridae.

Appearance and behavior
The African sheath-tailed bat weighs , with females slightly larger than males. The fur is a deep brown, but slightly lighter on the belly. The nose is a pointed cone shape and the rhinarium is black and naked. It is insectivorous, feeding on a range of insects, but particularly beetles and lepidopterans. Feeding is strongly dependent on the season, with much greater feeding activity occurring during the rainy season. It lives in caverns in groups exceeding 50,000. Within colonies, the social structure consists of harems of around 20 females being attended usually by a single male. While female juveniles sometimes remain within the cluster into which they were born, young males disperse and join bachelor clusters.

Distribution and habitat
The African sheath-tailed bat is found in Angola, Benin, the Central African Republic, the Republic of the Congo, the Democratic Republic of the Congo, Ivory Coast, Djibouti, Eritrea, Ethiopia, Ghana, Guinea, Guinea-Bissau, Kenya, Madagascar, Mozambique, Nigeria, Somalia, Sudan, Tanzania, Togo, Uganda, and Yemen. Its natural habitats are dry savanna, subsaharic shrubland, subtropical or tropical dry shrubland, caves, and hot deserts.

References

Coleura
Bats of Africa
Mammals described in 1852
Taxa named by Wilhelm Peters
Cave mammals
Taxonomy articles created by Polbot